Louis Bellson Quintet (also released as Concerto for Drums by Louis Bellson) is an album by American jazz drummer Louis Bellson featuring performances recorded in 1954 for the Norgran label.

Reception
Allmusic awarded the album 4½ stars.

Track listing
All compositions by Louis Bellson except as indicated
 "Concerto for Drums" - 6:03
 "Basically Speaking, Duvivier, That is" (George Duvivier) - 4:07
 "Love for Sale" (Cole Porter) - 4:23
 "The Man I Love" (George Gershwin, Ira Gershwin) - 5:38
 "Charlie's Blues" (Charlie Shavers) - 5:14
 "I'll Remember April" (Gene de Paul, Patricia Johnston, Don Raye) - 3:38
 "Buffalo Joe" (Shavers) - 5:34 	
 "Stompin' at the Savoy" (Edgar Sampson, Benny Goodman, Chick Webb, Andy Razaf) - 8:35

Personnel
Louis Bellson – drums
Charlie Shavers - trumpet 
Zoot Sims - tenor saxophone 
Don Abney - piano 
George Duvivier – bass

References

Verve Records albums
Norgran Records albums
Louie Bellson albums
1955 albums
Albums produced by Norman Granz